Alex Quinn (born 29 December 2000) is a British racing driver. He currently competes in the IMSA WeatherTech Sportscar Championship driving the No. 52 PR1/Mathiasen Motorsports LMP2 car. Quinn is the current rookie cup champion in the Formula Renault Eurocup.

Early career

Karting
Born in Truro and based near Camelford, Quinn started his karting career in 2011. He competed in multiple championships such as the Super 1 National Rotax Mini Max Championship and won multiple national karting championships.

Lower formulae
In 2016, Quinn made his car racing debut in the F4 British Championship, driving for Fortec Motorsport. He won three races and was crowned as the winner of the rookie cup.

The British driver continued to race in the F4 British Championship in 2017, partnering Oscar Piastri and Ayrton Simmons at TRS Arden. He driver would end up finishing fourth in the standings, beating Simmons but finishing behind Piastri, with the Australian becoming vice-champion.

Quinn also made a one-off appearance in the BRDC British Formula 3 Championship that same year, scoring a podium at Donington with Lanan Racing.

British GT Championship
In 2018 Quinn competed in six races of the British GT Championship in the GT4 class. Driving for Steller Performance, Quinn scored no points.

Formula Renault Eurocup
At the start of 2019, Quinn wasn't able to find a place in a championship. However, midway through the season he was given the opportunity to make his debut in the Formula Renault Eurocup for his former F4 team Arden Motorsport. He drove in three weekends, managing to score a podium at the Nürburgring and at Catalunya respectively. Quinn finished 13th in the final standings.

In 2020, Quinn substituted for Jackson Walls, who was unable to travel to Europe due to COVID-19 travel restrictions. Quinn got pole position for the first race of the season, scored a total of five podiums throughout the season and won the second race at Spa, helping him to fourth in the drivers' championship. He also won the rookie title.

Formula Regional European 

For the 2021 campaign, the Briton remained with Arden, competing in the Formula Regional European Championship. Thanks to second places in Imola and Barcelona respectively, Quinn ended up ninth in the drivers' standings.

U.S. F2000 National Championship 
In May 2022, Velocity Racing Development and Arden International announced a collaboration which resulted in Quinn making a one-off appearance in the U.S. F2000 National Championship at the Indianapolis Motor Speedway. There, he would take victory in all three races of the weekend, a performance he capped off by taking the fastest lap on two occasions.

Sportscar career
Quinn made his debut in sportscar racing at the start of 2023, competing in the 24 Hours of Daytona for the PR1/Mathiasen Motorsports outfit. With the team's amateur driver Ben Keating having scored pole position in the LMP2 category, Quinn, along with Paul-Loup Chatin and Nicolas Lapierre, finished the race in seventh place. The Briton showed an impressive performance in his first endurance event, setting the fastest lap in class.

Racing record

Career summary

* Season still in progress.

Complete F4 British Championship results 
(key) (Races in bold indicate pole position) (Races in italics indicate fastest lap)

Complete BRDC British Formula 3 Championship results 
(key) (Races in bold indicate pole position) (Races in italics indicate fastest lap)

Complete Formula Renault Eurocup results 
(key) (Races in bold indicate pole position) (Races in italics indicate fastest lap)

‡ Half points awarded as less than 75% of race distance was completed.

Complete Formula Regional European Championship results 
(key) (Races in bold indicate pole position) (Races in italics indicate fastest lap)

Complete WeatherTech SportsCar Championship results
(key) (Races in bold indicate pole position; results in italics indicate fastest lap)

References

External links
 

2000 births
Living people
British racing drivers
British F4 Championship drivers
BRDC British Formula 3 Championship drivers
British GT Championship drivers
Formula Renault Eurocup drivers
People from Camelford
Sportspeople from Cornwall
Fortec Motorsport drivers
Arden International drivers
Formula Regional European Championship drivers
U.S. F2000 National Championship drivers
Karting World Championship drivers
WeatherTech SportsCar Championship drivers